Aghasin-e Bala (also Romanized as Āghāsīn-e Bālā; also known as Āqāsīn-e Bālā) is a village in Siyahu Rural District, Fin District, Bandar Abbas County, Hormozgan Province, Iran. At the 2006 census, its population was 80, in 28 families.

References 

Populated places in Bandar Abbas County